Jung Kyung-ho (born 12 January 1987) is a South Korean footballer who plays for Ansan Greeners.

He was a member of South Korea U20 team at the 2007 FIFA U-20 World Cup.

Club career statistics

References

External links
 
 FIFA Player Statistics

1987 births
Living people
Association football midfielders
South Korean footballers
South Korea under-20 international footballers
Gyeongnam FC players
Jeonnam Dragons players
Jeju United FC players
Gimcheon Sangmu FC players
Gwangju FC players
Ulsan Hyundai Mipo Dockyard FC players
Ansan Greeners FC players
K League 1 players
K League 2 players
Korea National League players
Sportspeople from North Gyeongsang Province